Amardeep Jha is an Indian actress and television personality.

Personal life
Jha lost her husband very early in her married life and she has a daughter.

Career
Jha began her profession with the serial Amanat in 1997, in which she assumed the part of Amit's mom. Her film debut was in the year 1998 where she acted as Jaya in Dushman.

Filmography

Films

Television

References

External links
 

20th-century Indian actresses
Living people
Indian soap opera actresses
21st-century Indian actresses
Actresses from Patna
Year of birth missing (living people)